Crane was a small galleon in the service of the English Navy Royal. She spent her early career in expeditions as far as Cadiz and the Azores. She later was assigned to the Channel Guard during two more attempts by Philip II of Spain to invade England. She maintained this assignment until she went to the Irish Station then back to the English Channel. She was finally sold in 1629.

Crane was the first named vessel in the English and Royal Navies.

Construction and specifications
She was built on the Thames possibly at Deptford under the guidance of Master Shipwright Richard Chapman. She was launched in 1590. Her tonnage was between 202.9 and 253.5 tons.

Her gun armament was in 1603 18 guns consisting of six demi-culverines, seven sakers, six minions plus two fowlers. Her manning was around 100 officers and men in 1603.

Commissioned service
She was commissioned in 1590 under Captain John Bostocke for service with Hawkyns and Frobisher's expedition. In 1591 she was with Lord Thomas to the Azores. In 1594 Captain Humphrey Reynolds was her commander and assigned to Frobisher's squadron. In 1596 she was commanded by Captain Jonas Bradbury for a voyage to Cadiz, Spain. Captain Sir Alexander Clifford was her commander with Sir Richard Leveson's Channel Guard in 1599. She was with the Channel Guard until July 1599.Later that year she was again under Captain Bradbury for the mobilization of the Fleet. She then came under the command of Captain Clifford in January 1600, followed by Captain Walter Gore in September 1600 and followed by Captain Thomas Coverte in November/December 1600, all three commanders for the Channel Guard. In 1601 she was assigned Captain Edward Manwaring for service on the Irish Station until March 1602. Then Captain Thomas Mansell took over until September 1602. Captain William Jones and Captain J. White were her last commanders for service in the English Channel.

Disposition
Crane was sold at Rochester on 17 June 1629.

Notes

Citations

References
 British Warships in the Age of Sail (1603 – 1714), by Rif Winfield, published by Seaforth Publishing, England © Rif Winfield 2009, EPUB , Chapter 4, The Fourth Rates - 'Small Ships', Vessels in service or on order at 24 March 1603, Crane Group. Crane
 Ships of the Royal Navy, by J.J. Colledge, revised and updated by Lt-Cdr Ben Warlow and Steve Bush, published by Seaforth Publishing, Barnsley, Great Britain, © the estate of J.J. Colledge, Ben Warlow and Steve Bush 2020, EPUB , Section C (Crane)
 Lavery, The Arming and Fitting of English Ships of War 1600 - 1815, by Brian Lavery, published by US Naval Institute Press © Brian Lavery 1989, Part V Guns, Type of Guns

 

Ships of the Royal Navy
16th-century ships